Laura Valentino (born September 29, 1989) is an American softball coach, currently serving as head coach of the UConn Huskies softball team.

Coaching career

Duke (asst.)
On June 27, 2017, Valentino was announced as assistant coach of the Duke softball program.

UConn
On July 3, 2019, Laura Valentino was announced as the new head coach of the UConn softball program.

Head coaching record

References

1989 births
Living people
Female sports coaches
American softball coaches
Fairfield Stags softball coaches
Charlotte 49ers softball coaches
Duke Blue Devils softball coaches
UConn Huskies softball coaches
Hofstra Pride softball players
Fairfield University alumni
Softball players from New York (state)
Sportspeople from Smithtown, New York